The women's shot put event  at the 1990 European Athletics Indoor Championships was held in Kelvin Hall on 4 March.

Results

References

Shot put at the European Athletics Indoor Championships
Shot
1990 in women's athletics